Nico Tatarowicz (born 23 April 1974) is a British actor and writer, known for The Armstrong & Miller Show (BAFTA winner) (2007), Very Important People (2012),  Crackanory(Broadcasting Press Guild Award Winner)' (2013) and Murder in Successville(BAFTA winner) (2015-2017).

Career
Nico Tatarowicz has written and co-written comedy, mainly for TV, since around 2005. Formerly writing alongside David-Cadji-Newby the pair's material made its debut on Channel 5's relationship sketch-show Swinging. 
This led to a commission to write for BBC 1's The Armstrong & Miller Show, which they contributed to over 3 series.

Having become regular sketch-show contributors, the pair began working on their own projects and Tatarowicz eventually switched to writing material that he could perform himself as well as for other people. His self-penned E4 Funny Cut The Viewing was broadcast in August 2008 to critical acclaim. He has since appeared as a character performer in several productions including Murder In Successville as 'Sid Lowecroft', Crackanory, The Warm-Up Guy, and Morgana Robinson's Very Important People (as Liam Gallagher). In 2012 Tatarowicz also pitched and shot a low-budget mini-pilot for a spoof rock-doc about The Stone Roses, which though never picked up, was put online where it became a cult viral hit.

In 2009 Tatarowicz provided the opening Voice-Over for the comeback series of Shooting Stars, and did some character voices on some of the same series sketches.

His written work includes several stories written over 4 series of TV Station Dave Crackanory, with his stories read by Jack Dee, Harry Enfield, Vic Reeves, Emilia Fox, Carrie Fisher, Paul Whitehouse and a double-length story read by Sheridan Smith.

in 2016 Tatarowicz wrote a one-off special for BBC2 show Morgana Robinson's The Agency, set around Robinson's take on Natalie Cassidy going through a day from hell.

In 2017 Nico co-wrote ITV2 espionage comedy Action Team with Tom Davis and James De Frond. The series was broadcast in 2018.

Since then Nico has written 3 humour books with sometime collaborator and friends Jason Hazeley, they are 'What Not To Say To Your Wife', 'What Not To Say To Your Husband' and the pandemic based 'Instructions For The British Citizens During The Emergency'. 

The pair also wrote together across 2 series of Spitting Image in 2020-2021 on Britbox. 

Nico is also a Podcaster, his own podcast project 'Stupid Hearts Club' features comedy chat and conversations around mental health. Nico often appears on Matt Morgans Patreon Podcast, and previously recorded episodes of a podcast called 'Sick Minds' with writer Alistair Griggs where the pair discussed funny, intrusive and dark thoughts with a guest. Other podcast projects are being developed in 2023.

Nico is a seasoned songwriter and live musical performer. He has contributed music to various productions including spoof songs for Liam Gallagher and Adele on Very Important People and 2014 Cinema release Benny & Jolene. In 2017 Nico contributed a tongue-in-cheek fictional Britpop hit to the indie-film Songbird'' directed by Jamie Adams. His first single release 'Beat It Back Down' can be found on Spotify.

References

External links
 
 Nico Tatarowicz' Twitter Feed

English television writers
English male stage actors
Living people
1980 births
British male television writers